The Green Party of New Brunswick was formed in November 2008 to run in provincial elections. It is a registered Green political party in New Brunswick, Canada. A founding convention was held on November 15, 2008, in Moncton where the membership adopted a constitution, and a charter of principles to guide the development of policies and platforms. A 12-member Executive Committee was elected.

On September 19, 2009, Jack MacDougall was acclaimed as the first nominated leader of the party. A community and political organizer, MacDougall is best known for his successful campaign to raise the money to purchase and renovate Saint John's Imperial Theatre. He is a licensed teacher in New Brunswick and stepped down as leader in September 2011. Greta Doucet served as interim leader until the leadership convention in the fall of 2012. David Coon succeeded Doucet as leader.

Coon was elected in the riding of Fredericton South in the 2014 provincial election. In the 2018 provincial election, the party elected three MLAs. In the 2020 provincial election, those three MLAs were all re-elected.

Leadership

Leaders

Current MLAs

Electoral record

2012 leadership election
On September 22, 2012, a leadership election was held to replace Jack MacDougall. David Coon was chosen after only one ballot.

See also 
 List of Green party leaders in Canada
 List of Green politicians who have held office in Canada
 List of New Brunswick general elections
 List of political parties in New Brunswick
 Politics of New Brunswick

References

External links 
 

 
2008 establishments in New Brunswick
New Brunswick
Non-interventionist parties
Organizations based in Fredericton
Political parties established in 2008
Populist parties
Provincial political parties in New Brunswick
Environmental organizations based in New Brunswick
Social democratic parties in Canada